The discography of American singer Jon Bon Jovi includes two released studio albums, one live album, two compilations and sixteen singles.

Albums

Studio albums

Live albums

Compilation albums

Singles

 + "Please Come Home for Christmas" was originally credited as a solo recording by Jon Bon Jovi when included on the Christmas compilation A Very Special Christmas 2 in 1992, but when released as a single in UK, Ireland and Europe in 1994, it was released as a Bon Jovi single under the band name. The cover artwork of the single was a still from the music video of Jon Bon Jovi and Cindy Crawford and the same Bon Jovi logo as was used on the albums Keep the Faith and Cross Road and the singles taken from them.

Guest singles

In 1980 Jon Bon Jovi made his recording debut singing on a 'Star Wars' themed Christmas album.  Along with a number of other children, he featured on the track  'R2-D2, We Wish You a Merry Christmas'.  RSO Records went out of business on the eve of the album's release so its run was limited to its initial 150,000 copy pressing.

References

Discography
Alternative rock discographies
Discographies of American artists